Wilfred Homenuik (born December 30, 1935) is a Canadian professional golfer. His surname is also spelled Homeniuk in many records.

Homenuik was born in Kamsack, Saskatchewan, and is one of seven brothers, many of whom have also played golf, most notably Stan and Ted. He has appeared in seven Canadian Opens and three World Cups.

Together with Moe Norman and George Knudson, Homenuik is regarded as one of the greatest Canadian golfers of his time, and has been inducted into many golf Halls of Fame.

Later career
Homenuik became the head professional of the Highlands Golf Course in London, Ontario, in 1976. In 2003 he was still working as a teaching professional at the Oakdale Golf and Country Club in Toronto, Ontario.

Trivia
Homenuik set the course record (65) for Windemere Golf and Country Club in the Alberta Open in 1961.

Amateur wins
 1953 Saskatchewan Amateur
 1954 Saskatchewan Junior
 1956 Manitoba Amateur
 1957 Manitoba Amateur

Professional wins

Regular career
 1961 Alberta Open, Manitoba Open
 1965 Canadian PGA Championship, Alberta Open, Peru Open
 1966 Panama Open
 1967 Millar Trophy
 1968 Millar Trophy, Grand Bahama Open
 1971 Canadian PGA Championship, Lima Open, Shreveport Open
 1972 Manitoba Open, West Palm Beach Open
 1973 Lake Michigan Classic, Labatt "50" Invitational
 1978 Lake Worth Open

Senior career
 1990 CPGA Ontario Senior Champion

Team appearances
World Cup (representing Canada): 1965, 1971, 1974

See also
1966 PGA Tour Qualifying School graduates

References

External links
Wilf Homenuik – Canadian Golf Hall of Fame
Wilf Homenuik's biography at the RCGA
Wilf Homenuik honoured by The Ukrainian community of Saskatchewan

Canadian male golfers
Golfing people from Saskatchewan
Canadian people of Ukrainian descent
People from Kamsack, Saskatchewan
1935 births
Living people